Roseanna may refer to:

People 
 Roseanna Bourke, New Zealand academic and registered educational psychologist
Roseanna Vitro, a jazz singer and educator

Media 
 Roseanna (novel), by Sjöwall and Wahlöö, the first novel in their detective series revolving around Martin Beck and his team
 Roseanna (1967 film), a Swedish film directed by Hans Abramson
 Roseanna (1993 film), a Swedish film directed by Daniel Alfredson
 Roseanna McCoy, a 1949 American drama film directed by Irving Reis

See also 
 Roseanne (name)
 Rosanna (disambiguation)
 Roxana (disambiguation)